Typhoon Nari, known in the Philippines as Tropical Storm Kiko, was an unusually long-lived category 3 typhoon which took an erratic, two week track near Taiwan during September 2001. It was the 16th typhoon to be named in the 2001 Pacific typhoon season.

Meteorological history

Impact

Striking two months after Taiwan's second deadliest typhoon, Toraji, Nari brought torrential rainfall to much of the island. Numerous landslides triggered by the storm's rain destroyed homes and buried people. At least 94 people were killed on the island due to the storm and 10 others were listed as missing. Agricultural losses from Nari were estimated at NT$2.9 billion (US$84 million). On September 17, some areas recorded a record-breaking  during a single day, equivalent to four months of rain in Taiwan. At the height of the storm, an estimated 650,000 people were without power and 350,000 lost their water and telephone service. Most of the fatalities took place around the city of Taipei and nearby counties. The metro system in the city was severely damaged by floods and was not expected to be working for at least six months.

Aftermath
In response to the severe damage, the Taiwanese government deployed roughly 8,000 soldiers to assist in search-and-rescue operations across the island. Nearly 10,000 people in northern and central Taiwan were relocated to shelters set up across the region.

Already suffering from an economic downturn from the September 11, 2001 terrorist attacks in the United States, the economy of Taiwan was severely affected by Nari. Businesses across the island were shut down and the stock exchange was closed for several days. Moreover, after it reopened, there was significantly less stock activity as hundreds of thousands of residents were either unable to get to work or were hampered by travel issues.

See also

2001 Pacific typhoon season
 List of wettest tropical cyclones

References

External links

The JMA's Best Track Data on Typhoon Nari (0116) 
The JMA's RSMC Best Track Data (Graphics) on Typhoon Nari (0116)
The JMA's RSMC Best Track Data (Text)
The JTWC's Best Track Data on Typhoon 20W (Nari)

2001 Pacific typhoon season
Typhoons in Taiwan
Typhoons in Japan
2001 in Taiwan
2001 in Japan
Typhoons
Nari